KCJB "91 Country" 910 is a country radio station in Minot, North Dakota. KCJB carries the Minnesota Twins.

iHeartMedia, Inc. also owns and operates KYYX 97.1 (Country), KRRZ 1390 (Classic Hits/Talk), KIZZ 93.7 (Top 40), KMXA-FM 99.9 (AC), and KZPR 105.3 (Mainstream Rock) in Minot.

Past personalities 
Jim Adelson, sportscaster (1952-1953)

References

External links
FCC History Cards for KCJB
91 Country official website

CJB
Classic country radio stations in the United States
Radio stations established in 1950
IHeartMedia radio stations
1950 establishments in North Dakota
Ward County, North Dakota